Hokusai Manga, better known internationally with its exploitative title Edo Porn, is a 1981 biographical drama based on the life of Japanese artist Hokusai directed by Kaneto Shindo. It draws visual and narrative inspiration from the artist's eponymous collection of sketches and focuses on an anachronistic story related to creation of The Dream of the Fisherman's Wife.

Plot
Tetsuzō (Ken Ogata) is an unsuccessful ukiyo-e painter who lives with his daughter Ōei (Yūko Tanaka) in poverty over a geta shop owned by Ōyaku (Nobuko Otowa), the older wife of the aspirant writer Sashichi (Toshiyuki Nishida) who is a childhood friend of Tetsuzō.

Tetsuzō lives by borrowing money from his adoptive father, the Shogunate mirror-maker Nakajima Ise (Frankie Sakai). One day, he meets a young, beautiful prostitute named Ōnao (Kanako Higuchi) and leaves her to Nakajima as a concubine. Meanwhile, Tetsuzō has grown a destructive obsession for Ōnao. Ōnao is a sadist with a traumatic past. She psychologically torments Nakajima until he hangs himself and leaves.

After Ōyaku dies, Sashichi, adopting the pen name Bakin, devotes his life to writing and ignores Ōei's advances who has intimate feelings for him. Nevertheless, Ōei continues to love him, which results in her celibacy.

Years later and after hard-earned fame, Tetsuzō (now Hokusai) is 89. He lives by painting Ichimatsu dolls with Ōei. One day, Ōei finds a peasant girl who looks like Ōnao (played by the same actress). After he sees a young ama playing with a dead octopus, Hokusai persuades the girl to pose for the shunga of an ama engaged in a threesome with two octopuses.

Cast
 Ken Ogata as Tetsuzō
 Toshiyuki Nishida as Sashichi
 Yūko Tanaka as Ōei
 Kanako Higuchi as Ōnao
 Frankie Sakai as Nakajima Ise
 Nobuko Otowa as Ōyaku
 Yoichi Sase as Gosuke
 Taiji Tonoyama as the woodcarver
 Joe Shishido as Jippensha Ikku
 Kon Omura as Shikitei Sanba
 Kinya Aikawa as Utamaro
 Rokko Toura
 Hideo Kanze as Kanō Torukawa
 Kunio Otsuka as Tsutaya Jūzaburō

References

External links
 
 

Shochiku films
Films directed by Kaneto Shindo
1981 films
Hokusai
1980s Japanese films